Russell B. Farr is an Australian editor and writer of speculative fiction.

Biography
Farr was born in Perth, Western Australia. In 1996 he founded Ticonderoga Publications publishing works by authors such as Sean Williams and Stephen Dedman. In 1999 Farr created the online journal Ticonderoga Online, which in 2006 won the Ditmar Award for best fanzine. In 2008 Farr won the Ditmar Award for best collected work as the editor of the anthology Fantastic Wonder Stories. He also won the 2008 Aurealis Award for best collection as the editor of Sean Williams' collection Magic Dirt: The Best of Sean Williams. Farr as a writer has published over 100 stories articles, reviews and essays. He now lives in Greenwood, Western Australia.

Awards and nominations

Bibliography

Anthologies
As editor
Fantastic Wonder Stories (2007)
The Workers' Paradise (2007, co-edited with Nick Evans)
Belong (2010)

Collections
As editor
Antique Futures: The Best of Terry Dowling (1999, co-editor)
Magic Dirt: The Best of Sean Williams (2008)

Journals
As editor
Ticonderoga Online (1999–present)

Essays
Afterword - Imagining Troy (2006) in Troy (a collection by Simon Brown)
Where There is the Fantastic, There is Wonder (2007) in Fantastic Wonder Stories

References
General
Bibliography at Members.iinet.net.au. Archived from the original.

Specific

External links

Ticonderoga Publications

Year of birth missing (living people)
Living people
Australian book editors
Science fiction editors
Australian publishers (people)